Leonid Fedorovitch Raikhman (1908–1990) (Леонид Федорович Райхман, also Reichman, alias Zaitsev), was a Soviet security officer, who rose to be a Lieutenant General in the NKVD, NKGB and MGB. He prepared evidence related to the Katyn massacre for the Burdenko Commission in 1943, and later, for the International Military Tribunal in the Nuremberg in 1946.

Notes

External links 
  Biography
   Biography

1908 births
1990 deaths
Recipients of the Order of Kutuzov, 2nd class
Recipients of the Order of the Red Banner
Soviet lieutenant generals
People of the KGB
Commissars 3rd Class of State Security